Sidney Richard Mulford (23 November 1896 – June 1973) was an English professional football forward who played in the Football League for Brentford. He began his career as an amateur and turned professional in May 1923.

Personal life 
Mulford served as a private in the Middlesex Regiment during the First World War and saw action in India and Mesopotamia.

Career statistics

References

1896 births
English footballers
English Football League players
Brentford F.C. players
Association football forwards
Northfleet United F.C. players
Dartford F.C. players
Footballers from Brentford
Southern Football League players
1973 deaths
British Army personnel of World War I
Middlesex Regiment soldiers
Date of death unknown